María Teresa Belandria is a Venezuelan diplomat, lawyer, professor of political science, and politician who was named by Juan Guaidó and received as Venezuela's ambassador to Brazil in February 2019. She served as the international coordinator for the Venezuelan political party, Come Venezuela. On 4 June 2019, the Brazilian government approved her credentials and recognized her as the official ambassador of Venezuela.

References

External links
 Personal blog
 

Living people
People of the Crisis in Venezuela
Venezuelan presidential crisis
Year of birth missing (living people)
Venezuelan women lawyers